D'Orbigny's chat-tyrant (Ochthoeca oenanthoides) is a species of bird in the family Tyrannidae.
It is found in Argentina, Bolivia, Chile, and Peru.
Its natural habitats are subtropical or tropical moist montane forests and subtropical or tropical high-altitude shrubland.

Gallery

References

D'Orbigny's chat-tyrant
Birds of the Puna grassland
D'Orbigny's chat-tyrant
Taxonomy articles created by Polbot